Alan Arnold Diamonstein (August 20, 1931 – October 17, 2019) was an American attorney and Democratic Party politician.

Diamonstein served in the Virginia House of Delegates from 1968 to 2002, representing parts of Newport News. Diamonstein chose not to run for reelection in 2001, seeking instead the Democratic nomination for lieutenant governor. He came in second to Richmond mayor Tim Kaine, who would go on to win in the general election. Diamonstein was the chair of the Democratic Party of Virginia from 1982 to 1985.

References

External links
 

1931 births
2019 deaths
Democratic Party members of the Virginia House of Delegates
Jewish American state legislators in Virginia
Virginia lawyers
Military personnel from Virginia
University of Virginia alumni
University of Virginia School of Law alumni
Politicians from Newport News, Virginia
20th-century American politicians
21st-century American politicians
20th-century American lawyers
21st-century American Jews